Pardina (1 Mai from 1983 to 1996) is a commune in Tulcea County, Northern Dobruja, Romania. It is composed of a single village, Pardina.

References

Communes in Tulcea County
Localities in Northern Dobruja